The Dzanga-Ndoki National Park is located in the southwestern extremity of the Central African Republic. The national park is split into two non-continuous sectors, the northern Dzanga sector (or Dzanga Park)  and the southern Ndoki sector (or Ndoki Park) .

Between the two sectors of the national park stretches the Dzanga-Sangha Special Reserve . The national park and the special reserve, each with its own protective status, are a part of the Dzanga-Sangha Complex of Protected Areas (DSPAC). 

Along with the adjacent Nouabalé-Ndoki National Park in Republic of the Congo and Lobéké National Park in Cameroon, Dzanga-Ndoki National Park forms the Sangha Trinational protected area, which was awarded World Heritage Site-status in 2012

Geography

The Dzanga-Sangha National Park is located in the extreme southwest of the Central African Republic in a triangular-shaped part of the country. The main river running through this region is the Sangha River.

The whole park is on alluvial sands. Along streams, forest clearings can be found with marshy depressions referred to as 'bai'. The Dzanga Bai (translation: "the village of elephants") is a sandy salt lick that measures . It is traversed through the middle by the Dzanga, a stream. Since 1997, Bai Hokou has the base site of the Primate Habituation Programme where gorilla habituation for tourism has been ongoing, along with research.

Logging occurred in the 1980s in the Dzanga sector but not in the Ndoki which is primary forest. Amis Kamiss wrote in 2006 of having visited fifteen diamond mining sites in the Lobé River region, located in the northwestern part of the national park.

Fauna and flora
There are three types of forest within Dzanga-Ndoki National Park: mainly dryland, a semi-evergreen forest that contains swamp-forest areas along the rivers and, a closed-canopy, monodominant Gilbertiodendron dewevrei forest. The dryland forest is an open, mixed canopy that is dominated by Sterculiaceae and Ulmaceae; often associated with it is a dense understorey of Marantaceae and Zingiberaceae. Along the Sangha River, there are stands of Guibourtia demeusii.

There are several intact populations of key forest fauna including the western lowland gorilla, African forest elephant, chimpanzee, giant forest hog, red river hog, sitatunga, endangered bongo, African forest buffalo, and six species of duiker. The gorilla density of 1.6 individuals/km2 within the Dzanga sector is one of the highest densities ever reported for the western lowland gorilla.

The Dzanga-Ndoki National Park has been designated an Important Bird Area (#CF008). The IBA is contiguous with two other IBAs, Lobéké of Cameroon (#CM033) and Nouabalé-Ndoki in Congo (#CG001). Over 350 bird species have been reported at the national park of which at least 260 can be expected to breed. Stiphrornis sanghensis has been described as a new species noted only within Dzanga-Sangha, but further investigation is pending as it may also occur in adjacent parts of Democratic Republic of the Congo, Cameroon and Republic of the Congo.

In May 2013, the slaughtering of 26 African forest elephants by poachers in Dzanga Bai, a reserve in the World Heritage Site Sangha Trinational led to worldwide concern by conservationists.

References

National parks of the Central African Republic
Protected areas of the Central African Republic
Protected areas established in 1990
World Heritage Sites in Africa
Sangha-Mbaéré